Aishah and The Fan Club, better known as The Fan Club or just Fan Club, were a New Zealand-based singing group in the late 1980s and early 1990s. The group released their first album Sensation in 1988, which spawned three top-20 singles in the New Zealand and Malaysian charts, "Sensation", "Paradise" and "Call Me" – the latter being a remake of a Spagna song of the same name.

Their second album, titled Respect the Beat, also produced three hit singles, including "I Feel Love" and "I Never Gave Up on You", and the band's only single to make the US Billboard Hot 100 Charts – "Don't Let Me Fall Alone". The remixes for this song were among the most played dance tunes in clubs at the time.

The group was formed while Aishah was in New Zealand studying in the late 1980s. She was spotted by the other members of the group, and asked to join the band. Besides Aishah who sang lead vocals, the other members included Paul Moss on guitar and programming, Dave Larsen on drums, Glenn Peters on bass, Malcolm Smith on keyboards, and Hazri Yutim on second keyboard/synthesiser. Malcolm and Paul were also the main songwriters for the group.

The band won the International Artist of the Year at the 1991 New Zealand Music Awards.

Aishah remains popular in Malaysia and has released music in the Malay language, while also entering Malaysian politics. Paul Moss also lives in Malaysia where he became one of the judges of the reality TV singing competitions Malaysian Idol and One in a Million.

Discography

Albums

Singles

References

New Zealand pop music groups